Sönke Möhring (born 12 October 1972) is a German actor.

Life and work 
He grew up in Herne. His father was an army officer and his mother worked as a teacher. He has a sister and two brothers. After his brother Wotan Wilke Möhring became an actor, in the early 2000s, Sönke followed him to also become an actor.

Möhring made his national debut in Stefan Ruzowitzky's Anatomy 2 and his international film debut in Quentin Tarantino's Inglourious Basterds.

Filmography

External links 
 

1972 births
21st-century German male actors
German male film actors
German male television actors
Living people
People from Herne, North Rhine-Westphalia
People from Unna